The 1998 Euro Open by Nissan was contested over 7 rounds/14 races. This was the first Open Fortuna by Nissan season which would go on to become the World Series by Renault. In this one-make formula all drivers had to use Coloni chassis and Nissan engines.

Teams and drivers

Race calendar

Championship Standings

Drivers

 For every race the points were awarded to the top ten race finishers: 20-15-12-10-8-6-4-3-2-1. An additional two points were awarded for having the fastest lap.

Teams

References

External links

Renault Sport Series seasons
Euro Open by Nissan
Euro Open by Nissan